John Hanna Robb (4 November 1873 – 21 June 1956) was a Northern Irish barrister and Ulster Unionist Party politician.

The son of Rev. J. Gardner Robb, DD, LLD and Martha, daughter of Rev. John Hanna, of Ballymagowan House. Robb was born in Clogher and was educated at Royal Belfast Academical Institution, Queen's College, Belfast and called to the Bar at Gray's Inn and King's Inns, Dublin in 1898.

He was a Stormont MP for Queen's University from 1921 to 1937, following which he was Leader of the Senate of Northern Ireland and Minister for Education, becoming leader of the senate on 15 December 1937 until 1943. From 1939 to 1943, he was Father of the Northern Irish Bar. From 1943 until retirement in 1954 he sat as a County Court judge.

Robb lived at Deramore Park, North Belfast, with his wife Emily and their daughter.

References

External links
 

Alumni of Queen's University Belfast
Members of the House of Commons of Northern Ireland 1921–1925
Members of the House of Commons of Northern Ireland 1925–1929
Members of the House of Commons of Northern Ireland 1929–1933
Members of the House of Commons of Northern Ireland 1933–1938
Northern Ireland junior government ministers (Parliament of Northern Ireland)
Northern Ireland Cabinet ministers (Parliament of Northern Ireland)
Members of the Privy Council of Northern Ireland
Members of the Senate of Northern Ireland 1937–1941
Members of the Senate of Northern Ireland 1941–1945
Barristers from Northern Ireland
Ulster Unionist Party members of the House of Commons of Northern Ireland
1873 births
1956 deaths
People educated at the Royal Belfast Academical Institution
Members of Gray's Inn
Members of the House of Commons of Northern Ireland for Queen's University of Belfast
Ulster Unionist Party members of the Senate of Northern Ireland